Sprengel is a surname. Notable people with the surname include:

 Hermann Sprengel (1834–1906), chemist
 Karl or Carl Sprengel (1787–1859), botanist
 Kurt Sprengel (1766–1833), botanist
 Christian Konrad Sprengel (1750–1816), teacher and theologist who studied flower biology
 Bernhard Sprengel (1899–1985), chocolate manufacturer and art collector

See also
 Sprengel Museum, a museum of modern art in Hanover, Germany
 Sprengel pump, a vacuum pump invented by Hermann Sprengel